The Bulgarian national ice hockey team (Natsionalen otbor po khokeĭ na led na Bŭlgariya) is the national men's ice hockey team of Bulgaria. The team is controlled by the Bulgarian Ice Hockey Federation and a member of the International Ice Hockey Federation (IIHF). As of 2018, Bulgaria is ranked 38th in the IIHF World Ranking and competes in Division III of the Ice Hockey World Championships.

The team has participated once at the Olympic Winter Games. This happened in Innsbruck in 1976, when Bulgaria fell to the Czechoslovak team 14–1 in the first round. After a few more losses the team finished last in the tournament.

Sofia, the capital of Bulgaria, hosted the games of Division II, Group B of the 2009 Men's Ice Hockey World Championships. Bulgaria's opponents at the tournament were Belgium, Mexico, Spain, South Africa and South Korea. In 2011, Bulgaria was also in Division II, with Croatia, Romania, China, Ireland and Iceland.

Historically, the team has played in the second highest level four times, with their highest placement being 14th in 1970. However, the only year that they ever earned promotion (by placing 1st or 2nd in Pool C) was in 1975, which also qualified them for the 1976 Olympics.  The only year that they won any games in Pool B was 1992 (at that time it was contested between nations ranked 13th to 20th), defeating Japan, China and Yugoslavia.

Goaltender Konstantin Mihailov played in 28 Ice Hockey World Championships with Bulgaria, and was inducted into the IIHF Hall of Fame in 2019, as a recipient of the Torriani Award to recognize his international hockey career.

World Championship record

References

External links

IIHF profile
National Teams of Ice Hockey

 
National ice hockey teams in Europe